Edward Thomas Fairchild (June 17, 1872October 29, 1965) was an American jurist and legislator, and was the 15th Chief Justice of the Wisconsin Supreme Court.

Early life and education
Born in Towanda, Pennsylvania, Fairchild grew up in Dansville, New York, where he was educated. He was employed in a newspaper and studied law in the office of Rowe and Coyne.  Later, he bought a farm in Dansville, where he would go to for vacations.

Career

After being admitted to the New York bar, he moved to Milwaukee, Wisconsin, where he worked in the district attorney's office. 

In 1906 he was elected to his first of three terms in the Wisconsin State Senate, ultimately serving in the 48th, 49th, and 52nd sessions of the Wisconsin legislature.  In 1916, during the 52nd session of the legislature, he was appointed a Wisconsin Circuit Court judge in Milwaukee County. 

In 1930, Fairchild was appointed to the Wisconsin Supreme Court and served as chief justice from 1954 until his retirement in 1957. 

In 1957, he administered the oath of office when his son, Thomas E. Fairchild, was sworn in as a member of the Wisconsin Supreme Court.

Notes

People from Dansville, New York
People from Towanda, Pennsylvania
Politicians from Milwaukee
Wisconsin state senators
Wisconsin state court judges
Chief Justices of the Wisconsin Supreme Court
1872 births
1965 deaths
Lawyers from Milwaukee
New York (state) lawyers